The 2018 Oracle Challenger Series – Newport Beach was a professional tennis tournament played on outdoor hard courts. It was the first edition of the tournament, which was part of the 2018 ATP Challenger Tour and the 2018 WTA 125K series. It took place January 22 through 28, 2018 in Newport Beach, United States.

Men's singles main-draw entrants

Seeds

 1 Rankings are as of 15 January 2018.

Other entrants
The following players received wildcards into the singles main draw:
  Thai-Son Kwiatkowski 
  Kei Nishikori 
  Reilly Opelka 
  Tommy Paul

The following players received entry from the qualifying draw:
  Tom Fawcett
  Christian Garín 
  Dennis Novikov 
  Guillermo Olaso

Women's singles main-draw entrants

Seeds

 1 Rankings are as of 15 January 2018.

Other entrants
The following players received wildcards into the singles main draw: 
  Jacqueline Cako 
  Danielle Collins
  Victoria Duval
  Claire Liu

The following players received entry from the qualifying draw:
  Amanda Anisimova
  Marie Bouzková
  Mayo Hibi
  Elitsa Kostova 
  Daniela Seguel
  Sofya Zhuk

Withdrawals
Before the tournament
  Jennifer Brady → replaced by  Jang Su-jeong
  Madison Brengle → replaced by  Stefanie Vögele
  Danka Kovinić → replaced by  Carol Zhao
  Varvara Lepchenko → replaced by  Jil Teichmann

Women's doubles main-draw entrants

Seeds

Champions

Men's singles

  Taylor Fritz def.  Bradley Klahn 3–6, 7–5, 6–0.

Men's doubles

  James Cerretani /  Leander Paes def.  Treat Huey /  Denis Kudla 6–4, 7–5.

Women's singles

  Danielle Collins def.  Sofya Zhuk 2–6, 6–4, 6–3

Women's doubles

  Misaki Doi /  Jil Teichmann def.  Jamie Loeb /  Rebecca Peterson 7–6(7–4), 1–6, [10–8]

External links 
 Official website

2018
2018 ATP Challenger Tour
2018 WTA 125K series
2018 in American sports
January 2018 sports events in the United States